Essex County may refer to:

Places 
 Essex County, Ontario, Canada
 Essex County, Massachusetts, United States of America
 Essex County, New Jersey, United States of America (the most populous Essex County in the country)
 Essex County, New York, United States of America
 Essex County, Vermont, United States of America
 Essex County, Virginia, United States of America
 Essex, a county in England

Other uses 
Essex County Trilogy, a trilogy of graphic novels by Jeff Lemire
Essex County (TV series), a television drama series adapted from the graphic novel

See also